Xylostola is a genus of moths of the family Noctuidae.

Species
 Xylostola indistincta (Moore, 1882)
 Xylostola novimundi Dyar, 1919
 Xylostola olivata Hampson, 1909
 Xylostola punctum Berio, 1955

References
Natural History Museum Lepidoptera genus database
Xylostola at funet

Hadeninae